Soehrensia thelegona is a species of cactus in the Soehrensia genus.

It is native to north western Argentina and can be found in a small range that occurs in the provinces of Tucumán, Salta and Jujuy.

It was first published as Soehrensia thelegona in Cactaceae Syst. Init. vol.28: 31 in 2012.

References

Flora of Northwest Argentina
thelegona